Plaue is a town in the Ilm-Kreis district, in Thuringia, Germany. It is situated on the river Gera, 11 km north of Ilmenau, and 8 km southwest of Arnstadt. The former municipality Neusiß was merged into Plaue in January 2019. Plaue station lies on the Neudietendorf–Ritschenhausen railway.

References

Towns in Thuringia
Ilm-Kreis
Schwarzburg-Sondershausen